Troy Township is one of the fourteen townships of Athens County, Ohio, United States. The 2010 census found 2,617 people in the township, 2,121 of whom lived in the unincorporated portions of the township.

Geography
Located in the southeastern corner of the county along the Ohio River, it borders the following townships:
Decatur Township, Washington County - north
Belpre Township, Washington County - northeast
Olive Township, Meigs County - south
Orange Township, Meigs County - southwest corner
Carthage Township - west
Rome Township - northwest

Wood County, West Virginia lies across the Ohio River to the southeast.

The village of Coolville is located in central Troy Township, and the unincorporated community of Hockingport lies along the Ohio River shoreline.

Name and history
It is one of seven Troy Townships statewide.

In 1833, Troy Township contained several stores and mills.

Government
The township is governed by a three-member board of trustees, who are elected in November of odd-numbered years to a four-year term beginning on the following January 1. Two are elected in the year after the presidential election and one is elected in the year before it. There is also an elected township fiscal officer, who serves a four-year term beginning on April 1 of the year after the election, which is held in November of the year before the presidential election. Vacancies in the fiscal officership or on the board of trustees are filled by the remaining trustees.

References

External links
County website

Townships in Athens County, Ohio
Townships in Ohio